Chicoreus brianbaileyi is a species of sea snail, a marine gastropod mollusk in the family Muricidae, the murex snails or rock snails.

Description

Distribution
C. brianbaileyi can be found in the waters surrounding the Solomon Islands.

References

Muricidae
Gastropods described in 1984